Englewood School District may refer to:
 Englewood Schools (Colorado)
 Englewood Public School District (New Jersey)